Coronae Montes is a mountain on the planet Mars. The name Coronae Montesis a classical albedo name. This was approved by International Astronomical Union in 1991.

See also
 List of mountains on Mars

References

External links 
 Gazetteer of Planetary Nomenclature

Mountains on Mars
Hellas quadrangle